Greenbranch Publishing is a privately held firm founded in 1998 and headquartered in Phoenix, Maryland. It publishes medical practice management titles, electronic media, and audio conferences for physicians, practice administrators, and office practice managers. The company is the publisher of The Journal of Medical Practice Management, the FAST Practice newsletter, more than a dozen text books specializing on the business of medicine, and several medical practice web sites.

External links
 

Book publishing companies based in Maryland
Publishing companies established in 1998
Companies based in Baltimore County, Maryland
Academic publishing companies